is a town located in Hidaka District, Wakayama Prefecture, Japan. , the town had an estimated population of 5,442 in 2678 households and a population density of 180 persons per km².

Geography 
Yura is located on the coast  in central Wakayama Prefecture, facing the Kii Channel to the north and west. The western part of the town contains the Shirasaki Prefectural Park, with a landscape made of limestone formations.

Neighboring municipalities
Wakayama Prefecture
Hirogawa
Hidaka

Climate
Yura has a Humid subtropical climate (Köppen Cfa) characterized by warm summers and cool winters with light to no snowfall.  The average annual temperature in Yura is 16.8 °C. The average annual rainfall is 1839 mm with September as the wettest month. The temperatures are highest on average in August, at around 26.7 °C, and lowest in January, at around 7.3 °C. The area is subject to typhoons in summer.

Demographics
Per Japanese census data, the population of Yura has been declining rapidly over the past 40 years.

History
The area of the modern town of Yura was within ancient Kii Province, and its landscape is mentioned in several verses in the Nara period Man'yōshū. Yura claims to be the location where soy sauce was first produced in Japan. The village of Yura established with the creation of the modern municipalities system on April 1, 1889 and was raised to town status on October 15, 1947. Yura annexed the neighboring villages of Shirasaki and Ena on January 1, 1955.

Government
Yura has a mayor-council form of government with a directly elected mayor and a unicameral city council of 10 members. Yura collectively with the other municipalities of Hidaka District, contributes three members to the Wakayama Prefectural Assembly. In terms of national politics, the town is part of Wakayama 3rd district of the lower house of the Diet of Japan.

Economy
The economy of Yura is centered on tourism. The industry is the MES-KHI Yura Dock Co., Ltd., a joint venture between Mitsui E & S Holdings and Kawasaki Heavy Industries, which repairs ships.

Education
Yura has three public elementary schools and one public middle schools operated by the town government. The town does not have a high school.

Transportation

Railway 
 JR West – Kisei Main Line

Highways

Local attractions
Shirasaki Kaigan Park
Kokoku-ji

References

External links

 Yura official website 

Towns in Wakayama Prefecture
Yura, Wakayama
Populated coastal places in Japan